Luca Ghiotto (born 24 February 1995) is an Italian racing driver who most recently raced in the FIA Formula 2 Championship for DAMS.

Career

Karting
Born in Arzignano, Ghiotto entered karting in 2008, when he took the title in the KF3 class of the Champions Cup, before he finished fourth the following year. Ghiotto remained in the KF3 category until the end of 2010.

Formula Abarth
In 2011, Ghiotto made his début in single-seaters, taking part in the Formula Abarth series for Prema Powerteam. He finished ninth in the Italian Series standings with a single podium at Misano, while in the European Series he finished sixth with four podiums. He contested a sophomore campaign with the same team in 2012, improving to runner-up spots in both championships.

Formula Renault
Ghiotto remained with Prema, as they moved to the 2-litre Formula Renault machinery to compete in the final rounds of Formula Renault 2.0 Alps and Formula Renault 2.0 NEC at the end of 2012. For 2013, Ghiotto had full-time campaigns in both Formula Renault 2.0 Alps and the Eurocup Formula Renault 2.0, staying with Prema. He took a podium finish at Le Castellet, as well as a victory at Spa, and finished ninth in the final championship standings. In the Alps series, he scored five wins and finished as runner-up to teammate Antonio Fuoco. Also he won the main race of the Formula Renault 2.0 Pau Trophy.

Ghiotto graduated to the Formula Renault 3.5 Series in 2014, competing for International Draco Racing.

GP3 Series

2014 
Ghiotto made his debut in 2014, with Trident, at Spa, taking pole position on his debut.

2015 
He remained with Trident for 2015, taking five victories in the season, but losing the title to Esteban Ocon by eight points.

GP2 Series
In February 2016, it was announced that Ghiotto would be graduating to the series, whilst continuing his collaboration with Trident. After a shaky start to the season, he claimed his first victory at the sprint race in Sepang and finished eighth in the overall standings.

FIA Formula 2 Championship

2017 
In , Ghiotto switched to Russian Time. He took one victory that season and finished fourth in the championship. Originally, he won both races in Monza, but was denied the feature race win due to leaving the track after having avoiding contact with Nyck de Vries and Charles Leclerc. After Ghiotto was stripped of his win, the victory was given to his country-mate Antonio Fuoco.

2018 

In , he drove for Campos Racing alongside Israeli Roy Nissany. He took four podiums and finished 8th in the championship.

2019 

Ghiotto moved to Virtuosi Racing to partner Chinese driver Guanyu Zhou in 2019. Ghiotto started the season very well with pole position, second place at race 1, and victory at race 2 in Bahrain. However, he scored only 2 points at Azerbaijan. The Italian once again took pole position at Spain, but was hit by Campos driver Dorian Boccolacci, who was later penalized with a drive-through penalty. He charged through the field to finish 4th and achieved another podium in Race 2, finishing in 2nd. At Monaco, originally, he finished second at the feature race, but was disqualified, and in the second race he hit the Arden car of Tatiana Calderon and the MP Motorsport car of Mahaveer Raghunathan. Ghiotto had to retire the car, and was given a three-place grid penalty for causing a collision with the two drivers. At Le Castellet, he also had a nightmare weekend. In Race 1, he was hit by Juan Manuel Correa, causing him to retire with suspension damage. In Race 2, he only finished 13th, scoring no points. In Spielberg, he took two podium finishes with two second places. In Great Britain, he qualified 2nd behind his teammate Guanyu Zhou, who also made history with achieving the first pole position of a Chinese driver in GP2 or F2. He passed Guanyu before the first corner, and took the victory in the feature race. At Hungaroring, he finished 4th and 8th respectively. 
In Spa-Francorchamps, the two races were cancelled after a tragic accident in the feature race, after Giuliano Alesi lost control of his car due to a puncture, which provoked an accident, that resulted in serious injures for Juan Manuel Correa, and the death of French driver Anthoine Hubert. In Monza Ghiotto took the fastest lap along with second place in the feature race, but after making contact with Sérgio Sette Câmara and Nyck de Vries he only finished in 15th position in the sprint race. At Sochi he finished fourth in the first race with taking fastest lap once again, however he lost the podium to Louis Delétraz on the final lap. In the second race, he came from fifth on the grid to 1st place and took his third win of the year. In the final round at Abu Dhabi the Italian scored 8 points in the first race by finishing sixth. In the sprint race, he started third, but overtook Nicholas Latifi for second place. A few laps later he passed Trident driver Giuliano Alesi for the race lead. Due to the retirements of Artem Markelov, Sean Gelael and contact between Nikita Mazepin and Matevos Isaakyan, there were three virtual safety cars. By that, Ghiotto extended his race lead and comfortably won his fourth race of the year. The Italian driver finished third in the championship, just behind champion Nyck de Vries and runner-up Nicholas Latifi.

2020 
In 2020 Ghiotto drove for the new Hitech Grand Prix team alongside Nikita Mazepin. He won the sprint race in Budapest and ended up tenth in the standings, five positions behind his Russian teammate. Ghiotto left Formula 2 at the end of the season.

2022 
Ghiotto returned to the 2022 Formula 2 Championship on a one-off return at Monza, replacing Roy Nissany as the Israeli driver was serving a race ban.

Formula One
In August 2017, Ghiotto participated in the post-Hungarian Grand Prix test for Williams Martini Racing.

Karting record

Karting career summary

Racing record

Racing career summary 

* Season still in progress.

Complete Eurocup Formula Renault 2.0 results 
(key) (Races in bold indicate pole position) (Races in italics indicate fastest lap)

Complete Formula Renault 3.5 Series results
(key) (Races in bold indicate pole position) (Races in italics indicate fastest lap)

Complete GP3 Series results
(key) (Races in bold indicate pole position) (Races in italics indicate fastest lap)

Complete GP2 Series results
(key) (Races in bold indicate pole position) (Races in italics indicate fastest lap)

Complete FIA Formula 2 Championship results
(key) (Races in bold indicate pole position) (Races in italics indicate points for the fastest lap of top ten finishers)

Complete FIA World Endurance Championship results

Complete IMSA SportsCar Championship results
(key) (Races in bold indicate pole position; results in italics indicate fastest lap)

† Points only counted towards the Michelin Endurance Cup, and not the overall LMP2 Championship.
* Season still in progress.

Complete GT World Challenge Europe Sprint Cup results
(key) (Races in bold indicate pole position) (Races in italics indicate fastest lap)

References

External links

1995 births
Living people
People from Arzignano
Italian racing drivers
Formula Abarth drivers
Formula Renault 2.0 NEC drivers
Formula Renault Eurocup drivers
Formula Renault 2.0 Alps drivers
World Series Formula V8 3.5 drivers
Italian GP3 Series drivers
GP2 Series drivers
FIA Formula 2 Championship drivers
Prema Powerteam drivers
Draco Racing drivers
Trident Racing drivers
Russian Time drivers
Campos Racing drivers
Hitech Grand Prix drivers
Sportspeople from the Province of Vicenza
Karting World Championship drivers
R-Motorsport drivers
Virtuosi Racing drivers
G-Drive Racing drivers
Emil Frey Racing drivers
FIA World Endurance Championship drivers
ADAC GT Masters drivers
WeatherTech SportsCar Championship drivers
Aston Martin Racing drivers
DAMS drivers